Skuhrov is a municipality and village in Beroun District in the Central Bohemian Region of the Czech Republic. It has about 600 inhabitants.

Administrative parts
Villages of Drahlovice, Hatě, Hodyně and Leč are administrative parts of Skuhrov.

References

Villages in the Beroun District